Nighttime Anytime is an EP by the Constantines released on July 8, 2003, on Sub Pop.  The first two tracks are songs that were later released on the album Shine a Light.  The third track is a Talking Heads cover, and the final track is an alternate instrumental version of "Hotline Operator" that differs from the track of the same name found on Tournament of Hearts.

Track listing 
"Nighttime/Anytime (It's Alright)" – 4:13
"Tank Commander" – 4:02
"Thank You for Sending Me an Angel" – 1:57
"Hotline Operator" – 6:55

References

Constantines albums
2003 EPs